The men's 110 metres hurdles competition at the 1968 Summer Olympics in Mexico City, Mexico was held at the University Olympic Stadium on October 16–17. Thirty-three athletes from 24 nations competed. The maximum number of athletes per nation had been set at 3 since the 1930 Olympic Congress. The event was won by Willie Davenport of the United States, the nation's eighth of nine consecutive victories and the 14th overall gold medal in the event for the Americans. Eddy Ottoz's bronze was Italy's first medal in the event.

Background

This was the 16th appearance of the event, which is one of 12 athletics events to have been held at every Summer Olympics. Three finalists from 1964 returned: fourth-place finisher Eddy Ottoz of Italy, sixth-place finisher Marcel Duriez of France, and seventh-place finisher Giovanni Cornacchia, also of Italy. The American team, including Willie Davenport (whose injury in Tokyo had ended a streak of four consecutive podium sweeps), Ervin Hall, and Leon Coleman, was again favored.

The Dominican Republic, Madagascar, and the Virgin Islands each made their first appearance in the event; West Germany made its first appearance as a separate nation. The United States made its 16th appearance, the only nation to have competed in the 110 metres hurdles in each Games to that point.

Competition format

The men's 110m hurdles competition consisted of heats (Round 1), semifinals and a final. The three fastest competitors from each race in the heats qualified for the semifinals along with the fastest overall competitor not already qualified. The four fastest runners from each of the two semifinal races advanced to the final.

Records

These were the standing world and Olympic records (in seconds) prior to the 1968 Summer Olympics.

Eddy Ottoz matched the Olympic record in the third heat. He did it again in the first semifinal, but came in second in that race—Ervin Hall set a new Olympic record at 13.3 seconds. Willie Davenport matched Hall's new record to win the final; all three men came in under the old record in winning their medals. Ottoz's final time was a national record for Italy.

Schedule

All times are Central Standard Time (UTC-6)

Results

Round 1

Heat 1

Heat 2

Heat 3

Heat 4

Heat 5

Semifinals

Semifinal 1

Semifinal 2

Final

References

External links
 Official Olympic Report, la84foundation.org. Retrieved August 13, 2012.

Athletics at the 1968 Summer Olympics
Sprint hurdles at the Olympics
Men's events at the 1968 Summer Olympics